Drillia armilla is a species of sea snail, a marine gastropod mollusk in the family Drilliidae.

Description
The length of the shell attains 7.5 mm, its diameter 3.5 mm.

Distribution
This species occurs in the demersal zone off East London, South Africa at depths between 145 m and 236 m.

References

  Barnard K.H. (1958), Contribution to the knowledge of South African marine Mollusca. Part 1. Gastropoda; Prosobranchiata: Toxoglossa; Annals of The South African Museum v. 44 p. 73 - 163
  Tucker, J.K. 2004 Catalog of recent and fossil turrids (Mollusca: Gastropoda). Zootaxa 682:1–1295

Endemic fauna of South Africa
armilla
Gastropods described in 1958